At , Lechuguilla Cave is the eighth-longest explored cave in the world and the second deepest in the continental United States. It is most famous for its unusual geology, rare formations, and pristine condition.

The cave is named for the canyon through which it is entered, which is named for Agave lechuguilla, a species of plant found there. Lechuguilla is in Carlsbad Caverns National Park, New Mexico. Access to the cave is limited to approved scientific researchers, survey and exploration teams, and National Park Service management-related trips.

Exploration history

Lechuguilla Cave was known until 1986 as a small, insignificant historic site in the park's back country. Small amounts of bat guano were mined from the entrance passages for a year under a mining claim filed in 1914.

The cave was visited infrequently after mining activities ceased. However, in the 1950s, cavers heard wind roaring up from the rubble-choked cave floor. Although no route was obvious, people concluded that cave passages lay below the rubble. Led by Dave Allured, a group of cavers from the Colorado Grotto gained permission from the National Park Service and began digging in 1984. Lechuguilla was also the deepest known cave in the continental United States at  until the exploration of Tears of the Turtle Cave in 2014. Drawn by the cave's pristine condition and rare beauty, cavers come from around the world to explore and map its passages and geology.

In May 2012, a team led by Derek Bristol of Colorado climbed over  into a dome and discovered several new, unexplored passages, pits, and large rooms. This new section was named "Oz", and many of its features were named after items from The Wizard of Oz. It was named "Munchkinland".

Geology

Lechuguilla Cave offers more than extreme size. It holds a variety of rare speleothems, including lemon-yellow sulfur deposits,  gypsum chandeliers,  gypsum hairs and beards,  soda straws, hydromagnesite balloons, cave pearls, subaqueous helictites, rusticles, U-loops, and J-loops. Lechuguilla Cave surpasses nearby Carlsbad Caverns in size, depth, and variety of speleothems, though no room has been discovered yet in Lechuguilla Cave that is larger than Carlsbad's Big Room.

For the first time, a Guadalupe Mountains cave extends deep enough that scientists may study five separate geologic formations from the inside. The profusion of gypsum and sulfur lends support to speleogenesis by sulfuric acid dissolution. The sulfuric acid is believed to be derived from hydrogen sulfide that migrated from nearby oil deposits. Therefore, this cavern formed from the bottom up, in contrast to the normal top-down carbonic acid dissolution mechanism of cave formation.

Lechuguilla Cave lies beneath a park wilderness area. The cave's passages may extend out of the park into adjacent Bureau of Land Management (BLM) land. A major threat to the cave is proposed gas and oil drilling on BLM land. Any leakage of gas or fluids into the cave's passages could kill cave life or cause explosions.

Microbiology
Rare chemolithoautotrophic bacteria are believed to occur in the cave. These bacteria feed on the sulfur, iron, and manganese minerals and may assist in enlarging the cave and determining the shapes of unusual speleothems. The claim in the BBC documentary series Planet Earth that these bacteria do not derive any energy from the sun is incorrect, in that sulfur-oxidizing bacteria found in the cave use atmospheric oxygen (derived from sunlight-driven photosynthesis) as an electron acceptor, with the electron donor (source of energy) derived from dissolved groundwater hydrogen sulfide gas.

Other studies indicate that some microbes may have medicinal qualities that are beneficial to humans. Some of the bacterial strains isolated from the cave have been found to harbor novel pathways for antibiotic resistance. A 4 million year-old strain of Paenibacillus isolated from soil samples in Lechuguilla Cave was found to be naturally resistant to many modern antibiotics, including daptomycin.

Filming
The Denver Museum of Nature and Science filmed one of the first documentaries in the cave, titled Lechuguilla Cave: The Hidden Giant, in 1987, featuring many of the cavers responsible for the breakthrough and initial survey work. The video was broadcast on the Denver PBS station KRMA-TV in 1989.

The 1992 National Geographic Society program titled Mysteries Underground was also filmed extensively in Lechuguilla Cave.

Lechuguilla Cave was also shown in the BBC documentary series Planet Earth. The fourth episode, titled "Caves", airing on April 22, 2007, documented scientists and filmmakers exploring Lechuguilla Cave, including the Chandelier Ballroom, which has high-quality crystals. The team took two years to get permission to film.

In October 2016, crew members from London-based production company Nutopia descended into Lechuguilla Cave with microbiologist Hazel Barton to film a sequence for season 1, episode 4 (titled "Genesis") of the National Geographic series One Strange Rock.

See also
List of longest caves in the United States
List of longest caves

References

External links

 Lechuguilla map and images
 Nova: The Mysterious Life of Caves, Journey into Lechuguilla
 The Giant Crystal Project
 Lechuguilla Newsletter from the National Park Service (PDF)
 BBC Press release: Planet Earth Caves and Lechuguilla

Caves of New Mexico
Limestone caves
Wild caves
Landforms of Eddy County, New Mexico
Carlsbad Caverns National Park